Joshua Prenot (born July 28, 1993) is an American competitive swimmer who specializes in breaststroke and individual medley events.

Career
In 2012, Josh Prenot began his freshman year at the University of California Berkeley. In 2016, Prenot won his first NCAA title at the NCAA Men's Division I Swimming and Diving Championships in the 400 yd IM. After finishing his career there, he felt pressure to succeed at the 2016 Olympic Trials. Prenot was a member of the US World University Games team in 2015. However, he and many other critics felt this was his last chance to be a professional swimmer. At the Trials, he placed third in the 100 m breaststroke at the US Olympic Swimming Trials. Later in those trials, he set an American record in the 200m breaststroke, also recording the second-fastest performance all-time in the event,  winning the final to qualify for the 2016 Summer Olympics.

At the 2016 Summer Olympics, he won the silver medal in the 200m breaststroke in a time of 2:07.53.

In July 2018,  Prenot raced the 200m breaststroke at the 2018 Phillips 66 National Championships and World Championship Trials and went the world's fastest 200m breaststroke time in 2018 as of July 2018 with a 2:07.28

References

External links
 
 
 
 
 
 

1993 births
Living people
American male breaststroke swimmers
American male medley swimmers
Swimmers at the 2016 Summer Olympics
Olympic silver medalists for the United States in swimming
Medalists at the 2016 Summer Olympics
Universiade medalists in swimming
Sportspeople from Sedalia, Missouri
Universiade gold medalists for the United States
Universiade silver medalists for the United States
Medalists at the 2015 Summer Universiade
California Golden Bears men's swimmers
21st-century American people